Caroline Brown (born 27 August 1980) is a Scottish international indoor and lawn and indoor bowls player.

Bowls career
Brown won the 2007 World Indoor Bowls Championship women's singles and five years later who won a gold and bronze medal at the 2012 World Outdoor Bowls Championship.

In 2009 she won the pairs gold medal at the Atlantic Bowls Championships.

After winning the 2010 Scottish National Bowls Championships she subsequently won the singles at the British Isles Bowls Championships in 2011.

She won the gold medal at the 2014 World Cup Singles in Warilla, New South Wales, Australia.

In 2018 she was selected as part of the Scottish team for the 2018 Commonwealth Games on the Gold Coast in Queensland that won a silver medal in the Triples with Kay Moran and Stacey McDougall. In 2019 she won the triples silver medal and singles bronze medal at the Atlantic Bowls Championships.

In 2022, she competed in the women's triples and the Women's fours at the 2022 Commonwealth Games.

References

External links
 Caroline Brown at North Lanarkshire Sporting Hall Of Fame
  (2010–2014)
 
 
 

1980 births
Living people
Scottish female bowls players
Bowls World Champions
Indoor Bowls World Champions
Commonwealth Games silver medallists for Scotland
Commonwealth Games medallists in lawn bowls
Bowls players at the 2010 Commonwealth Games
Bowls players at the 2014 Commonwealth Games
Bowls players at the 2018 Commonwealth Games
Bowls players at the 2022 Commonwealth Games
Sportspeople from Motherwell
Medallists at the 2018 Commonwealth Games